The San Diego mountain kingsnake (Lampropeltis zonata pulchra) is a subspecies of nonvenomous colubrid snake endemic to Southern California. Its state-level conservation status is "Species of Special Concern".

Description
A medium-sized (53–108 cm total length) snake with a distinctive sequence of red, black, and white rings (tricolor dyads: Savage and Slowinski 1990; these are similar, but yet different from the triads of Zweifel 1952b) in which relatively narrow white rings are always bordered by black rings, and red coloration, which can occur as rings or bands, borders alternate black rings (Zweifel 1952b; pers. observ.). Occasional aberrant patterns can be found in which rings are lacking (see Figure 2 in McGurty 1988). The number of tricolor dyads on the body (except the tail) ranges from 27 to 38, and between 15% and 100% of the red rings between body dyads are complete (Zweifel 1952b). The snout is jet black and the iris is very dark brown (B. McGurty, pers. comm.).

Citations in this page need to be referenced in the Source list below.

Taxonomic remarks
The taxonomic remarks made for Lampropeltis zonata parvirubra also apply to this taxon, namely:

"This taxon has not been reexamined since Zweifel (1952b) described the races of Lampropeltis zonata. Diagnosis of L. zonata parvirubra is problematic because allocation of individuals to this taxon requires using a combination of several characters simultaneously that individually overlap considerably in variation with other races of L. zonata. Biochemical analyses coupled to more extensive morphological analyses are needed to better understand the systematic status of this taxon. Since individuals of L. z. parvirubra are difficult to obtain (captive snakes notwithstanding), novel techniques such as DNA extraction from preserved specimens will almost certainly be needed to help resolve this problem. DNA analysis was performed on this taxon in 1999 (Rodriguez-Robles, Javier, et al. 1999) and the interpretation of the authors suggests that L. z. pulchra and L. z. parvirubra belong within the same subspecies, and merely represent a clinal variation in pattern from south to north within the range.  Interpretation of this taxon as a full species (Collins 1991) is unjustified and awaits the aforementioned analyses."

Distribution
This California endemic occurs in the Santa Monica Mountains (Los Angeles County); Santa Ana Mountains (Orange and Riverside Counties); Santa Rosa Mountains (Riverside County); and Corte Madera, Cuyamaca, Hot Springs, Laguna, and Palomar Mountain (San Diego County)(McGurty 1988; Figure 44). In reality, this snake is probably present on all mountains in San Diego County above 4,000 feet elevation, or which support proper habitat (Hubbs, 2004).  Its elevation range extends from near sea level to ca. 1800 m (Palomar Mountain, San Diego County). Two early specimens (SDSNH 9930, USNM 13889) and three post-1960 records (B. McGurty, pers. comm.) from western San Diego County suggest the possibility of native populations of this taxon near the coast. However, the latter records have remained unverified and the former may represent mislabeled specimens or escaped or released pets (B. McGurty, pers. comm.).

Life history
Lampropeltis zonata pulchra is an infrequently observed, secretive, cryptozooic snake, the life history of which is still only partly understood. The San Diego mountain kingsnake typically emerges from overwintering sites in March and may remain near-surface active through November, but it is particularly conspicuous near the surface from roughly mid-March to mid-May (Klauber 1931, McGurty 1988, Hubbs 2004), during which time it is active during the warmer daylight hours (pers. observ.). Later in the season, it may be active after dark, which is probably related to the fact that, like most snakes, it has a relatively low temperature preferendum and a relatively low critical thermal maximum (42.5 °C: data provided for L. zonata, subspecies not specified; Brattstrom 1965). Based on wild-caught captive individuals, mating probably takes place in May and eggs are usually laid in June or early July (McGurty 1988; pers. observ.). Females lay 4-9 moderate-sized (averages 36 mm long x 16 mm wide), bone white, leathery-shelled eggs that if similar to eggs incubated in captivity, require at least 2 months to develop before hatching (McGurty 1988). Hatchlings are usually first observed between late August and early October (pers. observ.). The time required to reach reproductive maturity in the field is unknown, but captive L. z. pulchra required 4–5 years to reach sexual maturity (McGurty 1988). If captive longevity records for other races of this species are any indication (see Bowler 1977), San Diego mountain kingsnakes may be relatively long-lived. Indications exist that L. z. pulchra may be highly philopatric, consistently using local patches of suitable habitat (McGurty 1988), but the movement patterns of this taxon are largely unknown. In most areas this snake is much more extant than previously believed, and not restricted to rock outcrops.  It lives underground, and has been found in rock-less areas utilizing stumps, logs, and artificial cover, such as old boards, tins, concrete, asphalt chunks, and even trash.  The only ingredients needed to sustain a population of L. z. pulchra are prey and shelter (Hubbs, 2004). This taxon is also probably primarily saurophagous, and only western fence lizards and Western Skinks have been recorded as having been eaten by San Diego mountain kingsnakes, but prey similar to other subspecies of L. zonata are probably also taken (Newton and Smith 1975, McGurty 1988).

Habitat
In the interior mountain ranges, Lampropeltis zonata pulchra occurs primarily in associations of ponderosa, Jeffrey, and Coulter pine, and black oak, and is infrequently found below the coniferous forest associations (Zweifel 1952b, McGurty 1988; pers. observ.), however, the snakes will also follow riparian corridors to lower elevations, such as Oak Grove campground in San Diego County (Hubbs, 2004). At lower elevations and in coastal ranges, it occurs below the edge of mixed oak-coniferous forest in riparian woodlands, usually in canyon bottoms, that have western sycamore (Platanus racemosa), Fremont's cottonwood, coast live oak, willows, wild rose (Rosa spp.), and blackberries. It may be found in narrow riparian woodlands in association with chaparral and coastal sage vegetation types (pers. observ.; see McGurty 1988). Rocks or rocky outcrops appear to be only one element of L. z. pulchra habitat (Hubbs, 2004), probably because they provide suitable refuge sites and they harbor the necessary food resources. Such locations may also provide overwintering sites, however, L. z. pulchra can also be found on chaparral covered hillsides in the Santa Monica Mountains, Santa Ana Mountains, and all other mountainous habitat they occupy, far from any rock.  The snakes live underground in all areas, and those lacking rocky cover simply utilize rodent burrows for refuge (Hubbs, 2004).

Status
California state status: "Special Concern"

This snake continues to be highly prized among collectors (S. Barry, R. Fisher, and B. McGurty, pers. comm.) despite prohibitions on collecting or selling it in California (Nicola 1981, California Fish and Game Commission 1990). The only individuals that can be possessed are those that were in possession of their owners prior to when the prohibition on collection regulations were implemented. Currently, this taxon is mentioned for sale in some reptile fancier lists at $250.00 per snake (pers. observ.); such a demand undoubtedly fuels a black market trade for this taxon among collectors. In addition, McGurty (1988) provided data for a single locality in San Diego County suggesting a local decline in L. z. pulchra that he attributes to overcollecting of this taxon. Since no obvious habitat change has occurred at this site (B. McGurty, pers. comm.), the interpretation McGurty provided may be correct. McGurty (1988) also cites the destruction of local habitat by overzealous collectors (the dismantling of outcrops and the shredding of logs and stumps), especially in San Diego County, as reasons for this taxon's decline (see also Newton and Smith 1975). Rock-chipping for this taxon as well as for selected lizards was a problem that was recognized over 15 years ago, and continues to be a problem in certain local areas despite the fact that altering habitat in this way is prohibited under current regulations by both State and Federal land management and resource agencies. Illegal fuelwood harvesting also adds to the problem of habitat alteration (McGurty 1988).  While McGurty (1988) pointed out a problem with caprock removal and other forms of "rock-chipping," it is now known that those alterations did not affect the survival of the snakes.  Currently, L. z. pulchra continues to be found in those areas of alteration, even utilizing the disturbed rocks, which now lie on the ground and create additional (if different) places for thermo-regulation (Hubbs, 2004).  Today, McGurty (pers. comm.) admits that the rocks are not central to the survival of the species, but merely a convenient place for thermo-regulation. When small rock structure is absent, the snakes simply thermo-regulate in burrows or under rocks that are too large to move.

Despite the illegal collection of up to a hundred individuals of this taxon in San Diego County each year, the sheer abundance of this snake in that area (Hubbs, 2004 estimates 15,000 individuals within the favored collecting area alone) and the small number of optimum days for such collection (approximately 10 - 15 per year) has allowed for a continued population to exist and thrive.  Those who have monitored the area for over 20 years (since the original commercial collection took place in the 1970s) have seen no significant depletion in snakes, however there has actually been a small increase in numbers (Hubbs, 2004).  While certain, easily collected sites exist in San Diego County, the vast majority of this snake's range and habitat are unaffected by collectors due to different habitat makeup (i.e. chaparral, coastal sage, sandstone, oak-woodland, and large riparian zones with little searchable habitat).  The current estimate is that nearly 2,000,000 of these snakes exist within all the habitat they occupy in southern California, and in light of the DNA analysis by Rodriguez-Robles (1999) which lumps L. z. pulchra with L. z. parvirubra, the probable population exceeds 5 million snakes.  Most of those serpents live within terrain that is roadless and inaccessible to collectors.  Therefore, the protection of this taxon based on fears of over-collection is unfounded (Hubbs, 2004).  A better system would be to protect the two populations in San Diego County that are at greatest risk from over-collection, or place a small bag-limit on the subspecies and encourage captive-breeding by hobbyists to supply those who wish to own L. z. pulchra.  This would remove the need for illegal collection of wild snakes, and quickly reduce the value of the serpents as more and more become available in the form of captive-bred offspring.  That program has worked well for the Rosy Boa and California Kingsnake (Hubbs, 2004).

Sources
California Department of Fish and Game - Habitat Conservation Planning Branch report

References

Further reading
Hubbs, Brian. 2004. Mountain Kings  Tricolor Books. Tempe, Arizona. 324 pp. .
Zweifel, R.G. 1952. Pattern Variation and Evolution of the Mountain Kingsnake, Lampropeltis zonata. Copeia 4 (3): 152-168.

Lampropeltis
Endemic fauna of California
Reptiles of the United States
Fauna of the California chaparral and woodlands
Natural history of San Diego County, California
Natural history of the Santa Monica Mountains
Fauna without expected TNC conservation status